Taki Dam  is a gravity dam located in Iwate Prefecture in Japan. The dam is used for flood control and power production. The catchment area of the dam is 152.6 km2. The dam impounds about 34  ha of land when full and can store 7600 thousand cubic meters of water. The construction of the dam was started on 1969 and completed in 1982.

See also
List of dams in Japan

References

Dams in Iwate Prefecture